Alberto Pinto may refer to:

 Alberto Pinto (interior designer) (born 1945), photographer and interior designer
 Alberto Pinto (mathematician) (born 1964), Portuguese mathematician